Sam Gee (born 28 February 1987) is an English former professional rugby league footballer who last played for Oldham, as a  or .

Early 
Gee was born in Wigan, Greater Manchester, England.

Career
Gee also played for the London Skolars and Whitehaven, during a seven year professional career.

He is the grandson of former Wigan prop Ken Gee, and the great-nephew of former England rugby league footballer Sam Gee

References

External links
Oldham R.L.F.C. profile

1987 births
Living people
English rugby league players
London Skolars players
Oldham R.L.F.C. players
Rugby league hookers
Rugby league locks
Rugby league players from Wigan
Whitehaven R.L.F.C. players